Terry Lee "TJ" Friedl (born August 14, 1995) is an American professional baseball outfielder for the Cincinnati Reds of Major League Baseball (MLB). After playing college baseball for the Nevada Wolf Pack, he signed with the Reds, receiving the largest bonus ever given to an undrafted free agent, in 2016. Friedl made his MLB debut in 2021.

Amateur career
Friedl attended Foothill High School in Pleasanton, California, where he played for the school's basketball and baseball teams. He was a letterman in three seasons for the baseball team, and had a .308 batting average. He enrolled at the University of Nevada, Reno, where he walked on to the Nevada Wolf Pack baseball team. He batted .216 in 37 at bats as a freshman. When told he would play sparingly again as a sophomore, Friedl agreed to take a redshirt year to preserve a season of eligibility. In his junior year, Friedl received more playing time. He batted .401, the 11th-best batting average in college baseball, and finished with the second-most triples, 17th-best on-base percentage (.494), and 24th-most hits (89). Friedl was named to the Mountain West Conference's first team. He was set to become the Wolf Pack's captain in his next season.

Mistakenly believing that he needed to play college baseball for three years, rather than attend college for three years, to be eligible for the Major League Baseball (MLB) draft, Friedl did not consider it an option. That summer he played for the St. Cloud (MN) Rox of the Northwoods League where he hit .373 in 16 games with 12 stolen bases and was selected to play in the all-star game but prior to the NWL all-star game he signed with the United States national collegiate baseball team, and compiled a .290 batting average and a .536 slugging percentage. Scouts for MLB teams began to contact Friedl about signing.

Professional career
Friedl signed with the Cincinnati Reds in July 2016. He received a $732,500 signing bonus, the biggest bonus given to an undrafted free agent. He made his professional debut with the Billings Mustangs of the Rookie-level Pioneer League, and hit two home runs in his first game. In total, he finished 2016 with a .347 batting average, three home runs, and 17 runs batted in (RBIs) in 29 games. In 2017, he played for both the Dayton Dragons and the Daytona Tortugas, posting a combined .273 batting average with seven home runs, 38 RBIs, and 16 stolen bases in 114 games between both teams. Friedl spent 2018 with both Daytona and the Pensacola Blue Wahoos, batting .284/.381/.384 with five home runs, 51 RBIs, and thirty stolen bases in 131 games between the two clubs.

Friedl spent the 2019 season with the Chattanooga Lookouts, hitting .235/.347/.385/.732 with five home runs and 28 RBIs. He did not play in 2020 due to the cancellation of the Minor League Baseball season because of the COVID-19 pandemic. In 2021, he played for the Louisville Bats, hitting .264/.357/.422/.779 with 12 home runs and 36 RBIs.

On September 18, 2021, the Reds selected Friedl's contract to the active roster. He made his major league debut that day as a pinch hitter. Friedl recorded his first major league hit, a home run, on September 19.

Personal life
Friedl has three older sisters. His second cousin is John Calipari who is the head coach of the University of Kentucky’s Men’s Basketball team.

References

External links

1995 births
Living people
People from Pleasanton, California
Baseball players from California
Major League Baseball outfielders
Cincinnati Reds players
Nevada Wolf Pack baseball players
Billings Mustangs players
Dayton Dragons players
Daytona Tortugas players
Pensacola Blue Wahoos players
Chattanooga Lookouts players
Louisville Bats players